The 1927 Hong Kong Sanitary Board election was supposed to be held on 30 December 1927 for the one of the two unofficial seats in the Sanitary Board of Hong Kong.

Only ratepayers who were included in the Special and Common Jury Lists of the years or ratepayers who are exempted from serving on Juries on account of their professional avocations, unofficial members of the Executive or Legislative Council, or categories of profession were entitled to vote at the election.

José Pedro Braga was elected without being uncontested.

References
 Endacott, G. B. Government and people in Hong Kong, 1841-1962 : a constitutional history Hong Kong University Press. (1964) 
 The Hong Kong Government Gazette

1927 elections in Asia
1927 in Hong Kong
Sanitary
Uncontested elections
December 1927 events
1927 elections in the British Empire